The 12th Basque Parliament is the current meeting of the Basque Parliament. Its membership was determined by the results of the 2020 regional election held on 12 July 2020. It met for the first time on 3 August 2020.

Election
The 12th Basque regional election was held on 12 July 2020. The governing coalition, composed of the Basque Nationalist Party and the Socialist Party of the Basque Country–Basque Country Left, increased its number of seats and obtained a majority.

History
The new parliament met for the first time on 12 July 2020 and elected Bakartxo Tejeria as president of the chamber in the first round of voting.

Other members of the Bureau of the Basque Parliament were also elected on 12 July 2020: Txarli Prieto (PSE-EE), First Vice-president; Eba Blanco (EH Bildu), Second Vice-president; Iñigo Iturrate (EAJ/PNV), First Secretary; and Gustavo Angulo (EP-EA), Second Secretary.

A month later, on 3 September, Iñigo Urkullu was re-elected Lehendakari.

Deaths, disqualifications and resignations
The 12th parliament saw the following deaths, disqualifications and resignations:
 8 September 2020 - Iñaki Arriola (PSE-EE) resigned after being appointed Regional Minister of Territorial Planning, Housing and Transport in the Third Urkullu Government. He was replaced by Miren Gallástegui (PSE-EE).
 9 September 2020 - Idoia Mendia (PSE-EE) resigned after being appointed Second Vice Lehendakari in the Third Urkullu Government. She was replaced by Ekain Rico (PSE-EE).
 21 September 2020 - Arantxa Tapia (EAJ/PNV) resigned after being appointed Regional Minister of Economic Development, Sustainability and Environment in the Third Urkullu Government. She was replaced by Aitor Aldasoro (EAJ/PNV).
 2 October 2020 - Jone Berrioazabal (EAJ/PNV) resigned. She was replaced by Ana Ruiz de Alegria (EAJ/PNV).
 25 April 2021 - Ander Rodriguez (EH Bildu) resigned after joinging the University of the Basque Country as a pre-doctoral investigator. He was replaced by Garikoitz Mujika (EH Bildu).
 3 June 2021 - Nerea Lupardo (EAJ/PNV) resigned after being appoint director of the Euskalduna Conference Centre and Concert Hall. She was replaced by Ainara Zelaia (EAJ/PNV).
 8 July 2021 - Aitor Aldasoro (EAJ/PNV) resigned in order to become an advisor to Arantxa Tapia. He was replaced by Elena Lete (EAJ/PNV).
 31 January 2022 - Kerman Orbegozo (EAJ/PNV) resigned after becoming a member of the San Sebastián city council. He was replaced by Garikoitz Mendizabal (EAJ/PNV).

Members

References

2020 establishments in the Basque Country (autonomous community)
Basque Parliament